Banafsheh Daraq may refer to:
 Banafsheh Daraq, Ardabil
 Banafsheh Daraq, Bostanabad, East Azerbaijan Province
 Banafsheh Daraq, Charuymaq, East Azerbaijan Province